The 2013 División Intermedia season was the 17th season of semi-professional football in Paraguay (second division), organized by the Paraguayan Football Association.

It will start on March 30 and will end in October.

Promotion and Relegation

Teams

Standings

Relegation
Relegations is determined at the end of the season by computing an average (Spanish: promedio) of the number of points earned per game over the past three seasons. The three teams with the lowest average is relegated.

Pos: Position, Avg: Average, Total Pts: Total Points, Total Pld: Total Played

Top goalscorers

See also
 Asociación Paraguaya de Fútbol

References

Paraguay
2013 in Paraguayan football